Sect of the White Worm is the first EP by Canadian metal band 3 Inches of Blood. It was self-released in April 2001. Vocalist Cam Pipes was originally only invited to record background clean vocals for select tracks after the recording process was mostly complete, However the band liked the idea of having him on board full-time and so he recorded more vocals which were dubbed over the rest of the songs before it reached its release.

Track listing

Personnel
 Cam Pipes – clean vocals
 Jamie Hooper – screamed vocals
 Sunny Dhak – lead guitar
 Bobby Froese – rhythm guitar
 Rich Trawick – bass guitar
 Geoff Trawick – drums

3 Inches of Blood albums
2001 EPs